Niklas Arell (born October 29, 1990) is a Swedish professional ice hockey defenceman. He is currently playing with HC TPS of the Liiga (Finland).

Arell made his Swedish Hockey League debut playing with Färjestad BK during the 2013–14 SHL season.

References

External links

1990 births
Living people
Bofors IK players
People from Ekerö Municipality
Färjestad BK players
HV71 players
Karlskrona HK players
Malmö Redhawks players
Rosenborg IHK players
Swedish ice hockey defencemen
Sportspeople from Stockholm County
HC TPS players